Mohammad Jamal Amin Jarar is a retired Jordanian footballer of Palestinian origin. He became the director general of Al-Wahdat SC after he immediately retired from playing football.

International career
Jamal retired internationally after his last match against Kuwait in the 2010 WAFF Championship, which resulted in a 2-2 draw.

Honors and Participation in International Tournaments

In WAFF Championships 
2002 WAFF Championship
2010 WAFF Championship

References
 Jamal: "I Still Played Against Kazma (KUW) Despite to the Exposure of the Five Stitches on My Eyelid"
 Goalless Draw Between Al-Wahdat and Shabab Al-Ordon Marking Mohammad Jamal's Retirement
 Mohammad Jamal: "Becoming the Managing Director of Al-Wahdat SC is a Pleasant Surprise"

External links
 
 

1976 births
Living people
Jordanian footballers
Jordan international footballers
Al-Wehdat SC players
Al-Baqa'a Club players
Shabab Al-Ordon Club players
Jordanian Pro League players
Jordanian people of Palestinian descent
Sportspeople from Amman
Association football midfielders